John Heaton may refer to:
 John Heaton (metallurgist) (1818-1897), British metallurgist
 Sir John Henniker Heaton, 1st Baronet (1848–1914), British politician & activist
 John Heaton (athlete) (1908–1976), American bobsledder and skeleton racer
 John Heaton (psychotherapist), cofounder of the Philadelphia Association in 1965
 John Heaton (The Bill), a character on The Bill

See also
 John Heaton-Armstrong (1888–1967), British government administrator